Chac can refer to:

 Chaac the Maya civilization rain god
 Chac: Dios de la lluvia, a 1975 film in the Maya language
 Red in the Yucatec Maya language
 Clonliffe Harriers
 Cannon Hill Anglican College
 ChAc, Chorea acanthocytosis, a rare hereditary disease
 chac, assistant to a priest in Maya society